Ayesha Sana (Punjabi) is a Pakistani performing actress who has appeared in television morning shows, film, television, and theatre performances.

Early life
Ayesha Sana was born on 12 November 1972 in Lahore, Punjab, Pakistan.
She graduated from Convent of Jesus and Mary in Lahore and attended Kinnaird College, where she studied law. She went on to get an external law degree at the University of London. 

Sana is a single mother and has one son named Ahad. Ayesha Sana, in like manner, performed in various shows as a host. She once hosted a television show called Lines of Style!. She facilitated a morning show Meena Bazaar in 2006 on PTV Home, it was a presentation of PTV Karachi Centre; it ended in 2007. 

In 2009, she rejoined PTV Home as a morning show anchor again from PTV Lahore Centre in a morning show named Meena Bazaar with Ayesha Sana and became no.1 Morning Show anchor.

Television

Awards and nominations
 2005 The 1st Indus Drama Awards: Nominated for Best Actress Drama Series in a Supporting Role

See also 
 List of Pakistani actresses

References

External links
 

1972 births
Living people
Actresses from Lahore
Pakistani television actresses
Pakistani film actresses
Punjabi people
Alumni of the University of London
Convent of Jesus and Mary, Karachi alumni
Kinnaird College for Women University alumni
21st-century Pakistani actresses
People from Lahore